Frozen custard is a frozen dessert similar to ice cream, but made with eggs in addition to cream and sugar. It is usually kept at a warmer temperature compared to ice cream, and typically has a denser consistency.

History
Egg yolks have been integrated into ice creams since at least the 1690s, though there are several notable invention stories that are associated with modern commercializations of this practice.

One early commercialization of frozen custard was in Coney Island, New York, in 1919, when ice cream vendors Archie and Elton Kohr found that adding egg yolks to ice cream created a smoother texture and helped the ice cream stay cold longer. In their first weekend on the boardwalk, they sold 18,460 cones.

A frozen custard stand at the 1933 World's Fair in Chicago introduced the dessert to a wider audience. Following the fair, the dessert's popularity spread throughout the Midwest; Milwaukee, Wisconsin, in particular, became known as the "unofficial frozen custard capital of the world".

Per capita, Milwaukee has the highest concentration of frozen custard shops in the world and the city supports a long-standing three-way competition between Kopp's Frozen Custard, Gilles Frozen Custard and Leon's Frozen Custard.

Major frozen custard chains in the United States include Culver's, headquartered in Prairie du Sac, Wisconsin, with outlets in 26 states; Freddy's Frozen Custard & Steakburgers, based in Wichita, Kansas, with more than 300 locations nationwide; and Andy's Frozen Custard, based in Springfield, Missouri, with over 117 locations in 14 states. Other chains serving frozen custard include Ted Drewes, Rita's, The Meadows, and Abbott's.

Characteristics
In the U.S., the Food and Drug Administration requires any product marketed as frozen custard to contain at least 10 percent milkfat and 1.4 percent egg yolk solids. The FDA also allows the names “french ice cream” or “french custard ice cream” to be used. If it has a smaller percentage of egg yolk solids, it is considered ice cream. 

Actual frozen custard is a very dense dessert.  Soft serve ice creams may have an overrun as large as 100%, meaning half of the final product is composed of air. Frozen custard, when made in a continuous freezer, will have an overrun of 15–30% depending on the machine manufacturer (an overrun percentage similar to gelato). Air is not pumped into the mix, nor is it added as an "ingredient" but gets into the frozen state by the agitation of liquid similar to whisking a meringue. The high percentage of butterfat and egg yolk gives the frozen custard a thick, creamy texture and a smoother consistency than ice cream.  Frozen custard can be served at −8 °C (18 °F), warmer than the −12 °C (10 °F) at which ice cream is served, to make a soft serve product.

Another difference between commercially produced frozen custard and commercial ice cream is the way the custard is frozen. The mix enters a refrigerated tube and, as it freezes, blades scrape the product cream off the barrel walls. The now frozen custard is discharged directly into containers from which it can be served. The speed with which the product leaves the barrel minimizes the amount of air in the product but, more importantly, ensures that the ice crystals formed are very small.

See also
 Custard, the basic egg and dairy preparations
 Frozen yogurt, the cultured and frozen milk product
 Gelato, the Italian style of ice cream
 Ice cream
 List of custard desserts
 List of frozen custard companies
 Semifreddo, the partially frozen type of dessert, sometimes a custard mixed with whipped cream
 Soft serve, a soft form of ice cream

References

External links
 FDA Standards for Frozen Desserts

 
Culture of Milwaukee
Cuisine of the Midwestern United States
Cuisine of Wisconsin
Custard desserts
Frozen desserts
Ice cream